Paris Police 1900  is a French crime drama television series created by Fabien Nury that was first broadcast on 8 February 2021 on Canal+ in France and was shown on BBC Four in October 2021. A follow up series of six episodes, featuring the same characters and called Paris Police 1905, was released in 2022.

Synopsis 
In 1899 in Paris, the Third Republic is in crisis again. Amid civic unrest fuelled by rumours of the impending release of Alfred Dreyfus, the government is under threat from nationalists, royalists and anti-Semites on one hand and from anarchists on the other. The situation is made worse by the sudden death of the President, Félix Faure.

It is against this background that Antoine Jouin, an ambitious young detective of the Police Prefecture, is assigned to investigate the dismembered torso of a young woman found in a suitcase floating down the Seine. In the course of the investigation, Jouin encounters Louis Lépine (retired Prefect of Police, recalled to restore order in Paris), Jeanne Chauvin (the second woman in France to obtain a law degree and to be licensed to plead at the bar) and Meg Steinheil (a notorious courtesan turned police informant).

All become involved in the suppression of a more serious plot: a threatened coup against the Republic, orchestrated by the Guérin family. Connections are discovered between the dead woman and the police, in the form of rogue officer Joseph Fiersi, as well as with the aristocratic Gabriel Sabran de Pontevès and his family.

Cast 
 Jérémie Laheurte : Antoine Jouin, inspired by (or precursor of) Louis-François Jouin, policeman killed by Jules Bonnot in 1912.
 Évelyne Brochu : Marguerite Steinheil
 Thibaut Évrard : Joseph Fiersi
 Marc Barbé : Louis Lépine
 Eugénie Derouand : Jeanne Chauvin
 Patrick d'Assumçao : Commissaire Puybaraud
 Alexandre Trocki : Commissaire Cochefert
 Hubert Delattre : Jules Guérin
 Valérie Dashwood : Mme Lépine
 Yannick Landrein : Sébastien Faure
 Jean-Benoît Ugeux : Morpinet
 Christophe Montenez : Gabriel Sabran de Pontevès
 Christian Hecq : Alphonse Bertillon
 Astrid Roos : Hélène Chagnolle
 Vincent Debost : Hector
 Anthony Paliotti : Louis Guérin
 Anne Benoit : Maman Guérin
 Renaud Rutten : Alphonse Chagnolle
 Nicolas Bouchaud : Weidmann
 Dan Herzberg : Jeannot Dornet
 Yann Collette : le comte Sabran de Pontevès
 Steve Driesen : Pierre Waldeck-Rousseau
 Olivier Pajot : Félix Faure
 Marie-Armelle Deguy : la comtesse de Vaudois
 Noam Morgensztern : Gustave Pertaud
 Eddie Chignara : Édouard Drumont
 Renaud Hezeques : l'inspecteur Guichard

Episode list

Reception

The show was widely praised by critics, with Phil Harrison, for The Guardian, describing it as "A classy, raunchy Parisian noir... A promising mixture of high intrigue and low cunning."

References

External links
 
 

2021 French television series debuts
Canal+ original programming
French-language television shows
French police procedural television series
Television series set in the 1900s
Television shows filmed in France
Television shows set in Paris